The Pyhrn Autobahn (A9) (Pyhrn motorway) is an Autobahn (motorway), in Austria. It runs through the Alps by two two-lane tunnels, the  Bosrucktunnel and the  Gleinalmtunnel. The longest tunnel on the motorway is the  Plabutschtunnel under Graz and its outskirts. The last section of the highway was completed in 2004. 

While in 2016 some sections still remain single carriageway, including some tunnels, work is progressing to make the Phyrn Autobahn fully dual carriageway. The second carriageway of the Bosruckstunnel was opened on October 19, 2015. The Tunnelkette Klaus (8 km) and Gleinalmtunnel (8.3 km — the last sections with a single carriageway — were planned to receive a second carriageway in late 2018 and in 2019, respectively.

The motorway south of the A2 interchange is a part of the Pan-European corridor Xa.

External links

 Exit list of A9

Autobahns in Austria